Beadsworth is an English surname. Notable people with this name include:

 Andy Beadsworth (born 1967), sailor from Great Britain
 Arthur Beadsworth (1876–1917), English football forward
 Gemma Beadsworth (born 1987), Australian water polo centre forward
 Jamie Beadsworth (born 1985), Australian water polo player

English-language surnames